Cedar Beach can mean:

Census designated places
Cedar Beach, New Jersey, USA
Cedar Beach, Southold (CDP), New York, USA
Cedar Beach, Egypt
Cedar Beach, Durham Regional Municipality, Ontario, Canada
Cedar Beach, Essex County, Ontario, Canada

Beaches
Cedar Beach (Babylon, New York), USA
Cedar Beach (Brookhaven, New York), USA